"Hello Pretty Girl" is Ronnie Dove's fourth single for Diamond Records, and his third chart hit.  

Written by Tommy Boyce and Wes Farrell, it peaked at number 54 on the Billboard Pop Singles chart. In January 1965, Ronnie performed the song on Dick Clark's American Bandstand.

Chart performance

References

1965 singles
Ronnie Dove songs
1964 songs
Songs written by Tommy Boyce
Songs written by Wes Farrell